The Cleveland Cultural Gardens are a collection of public gardens located in Rockefeller Park in Cleveland, Ohio. The gardens are situated along East Boulevard & Martin Luther King Jr. Drive within the 276 acre of wooded parkland on the city's East Side. In total, there are 33 distinct gardens, each commemorating a different ethnic group whose immigrants have contributed to the heritage of the United States over the centuries, as well as Cleveland.

History 
The first garden of what would become known as the Cleveland Cultural Gardens was the Shakespeare Garden which was created in Rockefeller Park in 1916. This project inspired journalist Leo Weidenthal along with Charles J. Wolfram and Jennie K. Zwick to organize the Civic Progress League which became the Cultural Garden League by 1925.  The group would fulfill the vision of many unique gardens honoring different communities that make up Cleveland. The City of Cleveland and the Works Progress Administration helped make the vision a reality.  As of 2021, the Cleveland Cultural Gardens Federation oversees the 33 garden sites.

The Gardens

British Garden (1916)
Hebrew Garden (1926)
German Garden (1929)
Italian Garden (1930)
Slovak Garden (1932)
Slovenian Garden (1932)
Hungarian Garden (1934)
Polish Garden (1934)
American Garden (1935)
Czech Garden (1935)
Peace Garden of the Nations (1936)
Lithuanian Garden (1936)
Rusin Garden (1939)
Irish Garden (1939)
Greek Garden (1940)
Ukrainian Garden (1940)
Finnish Garden (1958)
Estonian Garden (1966)
Romanian Garden (1967)
African-American Garden (1977)
Chinese Garden (1985)
India Garden (2005)
Latvian Garden (2006)
Azerbaijan Garden (2008)
Serbian Garden (2008)
Armenian Garden (2010)
Syrian Garden (2011)
Croatian Garden (2012)
Albanian Garden (2012)
Turkish Garden (2016)
Russian Garden (2018)
Ethiopian Garden (2019)
Lebanese Garden (2019)
Colombian Garden (in development)
French Garden (in development)
Egyptian Garden (in development)
Mexico Garden (in development)
Uzbek Garden (in development)
Pakistani Garden (in development)
Korean Garden (in development)
Vietnamese Garden (in development)
Scottish Garden (in development)
Native American Garden (in development)
Peruvian Garden (in development)

Further reading

References

External links

Cleveland Cultural Gardens

Parks in Cleveland
Urban public parks
National Register of Historic Places in Cleveland, Ohio
Cultural infrastructure completed in 1916
Historic districts in Ohio
Gardens in Ohio
Works about race and ethnicity
Parks on the National Register of Historic Places in Ohio